The 1995 Richmond Spiders football team was an American football team that represented the University of Richmond as a member of the Yankee Conference during the 1995 NCAA Division I-AA football season. In their first season under head coach Jim Reid, Richmond compiled a 7–3–1 record, with a mark of 5–3 in conference play, finishing tied for third place in the Mid-Atlantic division of the Yankee.

Schedule

References

Richmond
Richmond Spiders football seasons
Richmond Spiders